KGP may refer to:

 Kaingang language, which is identified by the ISO 639-3 code kgp
 Karoo Gemeenskaps Party, a small South African regional political party formed in December 2010
 Kharagpur, West Bengal, an industrial city in India
 Indian Institute of Technology Kharagpur, or IIT KGP
 Polish Police Headquarters (Komenda Główna Policji)
 
 KGP-9, a Hungarian submachine gun